Andreas Singer (born 16 June 1946) is a Slovak football manager and former player.

External links
 

1946 births
Living people
People from Rožňava
SV Horn managers
Slovak football managers